Annalee Jefferies is an American stage actress.

Early years
Jefferies' father was a ranch manager, and her mother was artistically inclined. She lived in Texas her first 11 years, then moved with her family to Australia. They returned to the United States when she was 15. She was active in drama in high school and college before refining her talent at the Royal Academy of Dramatic Art in London.

Career
Jefferies was in the nine-hour trilogy of Horton Foote's Orphan’s Home Cycle in New York, directed by Michael Wilson, which won the Drama Desk Award for Theatrical Event of the Season of 2010.

She toured England in John Barton’s ten hour epic Tantalus, directed by Sir Peter Hall. She spent 20 years as a resident company member at the Alley Theatre (1986–2007) and 3 years as a resident  company member at the Arena Stage (1978–1981). Her film credits include Hellion, Arlo and Julie, The Sideways Light, The Girl,  Monsters, Violets Are Blue, and No Mercy.

On television, Jefferies appeared in Dallas, and War of The Worlds.

She currently lives on a farm in Brenham, Texas.

Film and television

 Arlo and Julie - Tess (Dir: Steve Mims)
 Patriot Act - Dr. Christina Glenka (Dir: Wayne Slaten)
 The Sideways Light - Ruth (Dir: Jennifer Harlow)
 Hellion - Fran (Dir: Kat Candler)
 War of the Worlds
 Dallas - 2 episodes Carina (Dirs: Steve Robin, Jesse Bochco)
 Ain't Them Bodies Saints (film 2013) - Mary (Dir: David Lowery)
 The Girl (I film 2012) - Gloria (Dir: David Riker)
 Annabel (Short 2011) - Molly (Dir: Daniel Izui)
 Monsters - Homeless Woman (Dir: Gareth Edwards)
 Walker, Texas Ranger - Molly (Dir: Tony Mordente)
 Ned Blessing: The True Story of My Life - Flood Phillips (Dir: Peter Werner)
 L. A. Law "Dances With Sharks" - Janice Long (Dir: David Carson)
 No Mercy - Susan (Dir: Richard Pearce)
 Violets Are Blue - Sally (Dir: Jack Fisk)
 Charlie's Angels - Joan Freeman (Dir: Larry Doheny)Queen Sugar - Frances Boudreaux (Dir: Ava DuVernay)

New York stage

Playwrights Horizons
 What Didn't Happen - Elaine (Dir: Michael Wilson)

Regional stage

Royal Shakespeare Company, Denver Performing Arts Complex
 Tantalus - Helen of Troy, Clytemnestra, Andromache, Ilione (Dir: Sir Peter Hall, Edward Hall)

Hartford Stage Company
 8 By Tenn - Lucretia, Viola, Grace, Madge (Dir: Michael Wilson)
 The Night of the Iguana - Hannah Jelkes
 A Streetcar Named Desire - Blanche DuBois
 Seascape - Sara (Dir: Mark Lamos)
 Three Sisters - Olga
 Our TownHartford Theatreworks
 The Year of Magical Thinking - Joan Didion (Dir: Steve Campo)

Williamstown Theatre
 Enemy of the People - Mrs. Stockman (Dir: Gerald Freeman)

Alley Theatre, Houston, Texas

Dir: Gregory Boyd
 A Comedy of Errors - Adriana
 Travesties - Nadya
 One Flew Over the Cuckoo's Nest - Nurse Ratchet
 Measure for Measure - Mariana
 Tartuffe - Elmire

Dir: Michael Wilson
 A Streetcar Named Desire - Blanche DuBois
 Angels in America - Harper Pitt
 Lips Together, Teeth Apart - Chloe
 Dancing at Lughnasa - Kate

Dir: Misc
 Hedda Gabler - Hedda (Dir: Gerald Freeman)
 A View from the Bridge - Beatrice (Dir: Stephen Rayne)
 Death and the Maiden - Paulina Salas (Dir: Ken Grantham)
 Our Town - Mrs. Webb (Dir: José Quintero)
 Danton's Death - Marion (Dir: Robert Wilson)
 American Vaudeville - Fanny Brice (Dir: Anne Bogart)
 Alfred Stieglitz Loves O'Keiffe - Georgia (Dir: Eb Thomas)
 Henceforward... U.S. Premier - Nan 300F, Corrina (Dir: Alan Ayckbourn)
 A Lie of the Mind - Beth (Dir: George Anderson)

Great Lakes Theatre Festival
 Antony and Cleopatra - Cleopatra (Dir: Gerald Freeman)
 Uncle Vanya - Sonya

Long Wharf Theatre
 Tobacco Road - Elly May (Dir: Arvin Brown)

Arena Stage, Washington D.C.

 God Bless You Mr. Rosewater - Mary Moody (Dir: Howard Ashman, Mary Kyte)
 Kean - Anna Danby (Dir: Martin Fried)
 The Man Who Came to Dinner - Maggie Cutler (Dir: Douglass Wager)
 An American Tragedy - Roberta Alden (Dir:  Michael Lessac)
 Don Juan - Mautherine (Dir: Liviu Ciulei)
 After The Fall - Maggie (Dir: Zelda Fischandler)

Public theatre
 Aunt Dan and Lemon'' - Understudy: Aunt Dan, Mother

See also
 Royal Shakespeare Company
 Denver Performing Arts Complex
 Playwrights Horizons
 Long Wharf Theatre

References

External links
    
 The Learned Ladies of Park Avenue review from In Newsweekly
 The Learned Ladies of Park Avenue review from Theater Mania
 Best Actress, Annalee Jefferies in Bad Dates - HoustonPress 2005: Arts & Entertainment
 Annalee Jefferies Endures Bad Dates for Hartford Stage Run
 Bad Dates a one-woman show, reviewed by Hartford Advocate
 18 Tennessee Williams' The Night of the Iguana opens at Hartford Stage reviewed by Hartford Advocate
 The Night of the Iguana review from The Boston Phoenix
 8 By Tenn review from The Portland Phoenix
 Annalee Jeffries Joins Mandy Patinkin in Williamstown Enemy
 Alley Theater, Annalee Jefferies.
 What Didn't Happen, A CurtainUp Review
 Tantalus, A CurtainUp Review
 Tantalus, review by Philip Fisher (2001), The British Theatre Guide
 Tantalus, review by J.T. Bowen, May 5, 2001, Centerstage Chicago
 Alley takes classic Streetcar to a bold new level
 Six people freed from death row tell tales of injustice in The Exonerated
 Interviewed by Dean Dalton at KUHF Radio, Houston, Texas - March 21, 2002 (Real Audio Media). kuhf.org
 Annalee Jefferies at the ITDb
 Annalee Jefferies New York Times Filmography
 Annalee Jefferies Google Search
 Annalee's Web Site

American stage actresses
American television actresses
American film actresses
Actresses from Houston
Living people
20th-century American actresses
21st-century American actresses
Year of birth missing (living people)